Lee Young-Sik (born 1 March 1973) is a South Korean sport shooter who specializes in the trap.

At the 2008 Olympic Games he finished in joint thirteenth place in the trap qualification, missing a place among the top six, who progressed to the final round.

References

1973 births
Living people
South Korean male sport shooters
Shooters at the 2008 Summer Olympics
Olympic shooters of South Korea
Trap and double trap shooters
Asian Games medalists in shooting
Shooters at the 2006 Asian Games
Shooters at the 2010 Asian Games
Shooters at the 2014 Asian Games
Asian Games bronze medalists for South Korea
Medalists at the 2014 Asian Games
20th-century South Korean people
21st-century South Korean people